Some Kind of a Nut is a 1969 American comedy film written and directed by Garson Kanin and starring Dick Van Dyke, Angie Dickinson and Rosemary Forsyth.

This was the final film of Dennis King.

Plot
Fred Amidon is a New York City bank teller whose wife Rachel is divorcing him. Fred already has a new fiancée, bank colleague Pamela Anders, with whom he is about to embark on a vacation.

While on a picnic in the park, Fred is stung on the chin by a bee. Because it hurts him to shave, Fred lets a full beard grow. He returns to work from vacation and is surprised when his boss orders him to shave. Pamela doesn't care for the beard, either, but Fred is tired of always conforming to everyone else's desires and demands. He refuses and is fired.

Colleagues come to Fred's defense. The male ones grow beards in support. Co-workers go on strike and carry picket signs outside the bank, soon joined by hippies and jazz musicians with beards. Fred becomes an overnight media sensation.

Rachel likes the new Fred's backbone and fortitude. Pamela does not. She drugs his wine and has her brothers shave him. Fred wakes up with their work half-finished. He flees on foot, wearing half a beard and nothing else but underwear and shoes. Police arrest him and place him in a psychiatric ward. Rachel rescues him, they reconcile and Fred shaves the beard, which he never intended to keep.

Cast

 Dick Van Dyke as Fred Amidon
 Angie Dickinson as Rachel Amidon
 Rosemary Forsyth as Pamela Anders
 Zohra Lampert as Bunny Erickson
 Elliott Reid as Gardner Anders
 Steve Roland as Baxter Anders
 Dennis King as Otis Havemeyer
 Pippa Scott as Dr. Sara
 Heywood Hale Broun as Himself
 Peter Brocco as Mr. Suzumi
 Benny Baker as Cab Driver
 Harry Davis as Dr. Phillip D. Ball
 Roy Roberts as 1st Vice President
 Jonathan Hole as 2nd Vice President
 Robert Ito as George Toyota
 Danny Crystal as Dr. Abrams
 Lucy Saroyan as Samantha
 David Doyle as Larry, Bank Teller
 Carole Shelley as Rita, Bank Teller
 Jennifer O'Neill as the beauty (uncredited)

External links
 
 

1969 films
1969 comedy films
American comedy films
American satirical films
1960s English-language films
Films directed by Garson Kanin
Films produced by Walter Mirisch
Films scored by Johnny Mandel
Films set in New York City
Films shot in New York City
United Artists films
1960s American films